Kihelkonna St. Michael's Church, sometimes simply Kihelkonna Church, is a medieval Lutheran church on Saaremaa island in western Estonia.

History
The church was founded sometime around 1250 as a joint undertaking by both the Livonian Order and the Bishopric of Ösel-Wiek as a part of crusader efforts to Christianise Estonia. The church was built at a strategic location, by a harbour of some importance and at a road connecting western Saaremaa with the rest of Estonia. Originally, the church was designed to have a western tower but after a rebellion in 1260–1261, at which time the church was still unfinished, the plans were scrapped. The present-day tower only dates from 1899. Apart from the tower, the building of the church finished sometime in the later 1260s.

Architecture
Of the original medieval furnishing, very little remains. The interior is dominated by high, white-washed vaults. The altarpiece dates from 1591, and depicts the last supper. In addition, the church has a fine organ and a carved epitaph dating from 1650 by a local carpenter, Balthasar Raschky.

The exterior of the church is today dominated by the neo-Gothic tower, but the church also has an external bell-tower, dating from 1638. Such free-standing belfries were once quite popular in Estonia, but today the one at Kihelkonna church is the only one surviving.

See also
 Architecture of Estonia

References

External links

Lutheran churches in Estonia
Saaremaa Parish
Buildings and structures in Saaremaa
13th-century churches in Estonia
13th-century establishments in Estonia
Gothic architecture in Estonia
Tourist attractions in Saare County
Kreis Ösel